Kerstin Thiele (born August 26, 1986, in Riesa, East Germany) is a German judoka and a silver medallist at the Olympic Games 2012 in London.

Kerstin Thiele is a German champion in judo in the Middleweight (-70 kg) division.  She competes for the German club JC Leipzig, and was part of the German national team.

At the 2012 Olympics she reached the women's middleweight judo final vs. Lucie Décosse, who won the gold medal.  On the way Thiele beat Moira de Villiers, Anett Meszaros, Edith Bosch and Chen Fei.

References

External links
 
 Kerstin Thiele at london.judobund.de

1986 births
Living people
German female judoka
Olympic judoka of Germany
Judoka at the 2012 Summer Olympics
Olympic silver medalists for Germany
Olympic medalists in judo
People from Riesa
Sportspeople from Saxony
Medalists at the 2012 Summer Olympics